Zuzana Hlavoňová (née Kováčiková ), born 16 April 1973) is a Czech Republic former high jumper. Born in Šaľa, Czechoslovakia, she competed at three Olympic Games, and won silver medals at the 1999 World Indoor Championships and the 2000 European Indoor Championships. Her personal best jump is 2.00 metres, achieved in June 2000 in Prague.

Achievements

Notes:
 (q) indicates overall position in qualifying round
 (#) indicates height achieved in qualifying round. Only shown if superior to height reached in final.

External links

1973 births
Living people
Czech female high jumpers
Athletes (track and field) at the 1996 Summer Olympics
Athletes (track and field) at the 2000 Summer Olympics
Athletes (track and field) at the 2004 Summer Olympics
Olympic athletes of the Czech Republic
Sportspeople from Šaľa